Zenas Newton Estes Jr. (December 6, 1877 – February 23, 1943) was an American football coach. He served as the head football coach at the University of Mississippi (Ole Miss) in 1900. During his one-season tenure at Ole Miss, Estes compiled an overall record of zero wins and three losses (0–3). In 1899, he graduated from the University of Virginia in law. He later worked as an attorney Memphis, Tennessee. He died of a heart attack in 1943.

Head coaching record

References

External links
 

1877 births
1943 deaths
19th-century players of American football
Ole Miss Rebels football coaches
Virginia Cavaliers football players
Sportspeople from Memphis, Tennessee
Players of American football from Memphis, Tennessee